The Kintamani or the Kintamani-Bali Dog is a dog native to the Indonesian island of Bali and originated from the Kintamani region. It is a popular pet for the Balinese and locally Bali's only official breed. The breed was developed from free-roaming local Bali street dogs and was recognised by the FCI in 2019.

Lineage
A genetic study indicates that the Kintamani dog is native to Bali and was derived from Bali street dogs. The Bali street dogs are most closely aligned with the Australian dingo, more distantly related to AKC recognized breeds of Asian origin but not those of European origin. Therefore, the Kintamani dog was developed from Balinese dogs with little loss of genetic diversity.

The ancestors of the Balinese street dog arrived on Bali around 3,000 years ago and had been largely isolated since. A rabies control measure implemented in 1926 meant that foreign dogs could not enter Bali. Therefore, these dogs have free-bred and free-roamed for thousands of years with limited genetic change.

Characteristics
The Kintamani looks something like a mix between the Samoyed and a Malamute. They have long hair, a broad face, a flat forehead, and flat cheeks like Chinese dogs such as the Chow Chow and are amenable to life as a pet.  Whilst many live much the same kind of life as an average village dog, they dig holes to nest their young and some live in small caves among the boulders around Kintamani. They are locally considered good-looking dogs are more often sought after as good pets. The Kintamani dog is gentle around people, yet retains enough assertive behavior to render it a noteworthy (but not vicious) watchdog.

The most desired coat color is white – preferably with apricot-tipped ears. Breeders often confine the dogs to cold dark caves near the Kintamani volcano, insisting it an essential step in developing the thick white coat. The FCI standard also accepts fawn (beige), red, brindle, and black colours. In fawn, red, and brindle variations the black mask is preferred.

The desired physical traits of the Kintamani dog include erect ears, forwardly curved tail held at the midline, medium to longhaired coat, almond-shaped brown eyes, and black skin pigment.

Bali street dogs come in many colors and coat patterns, and they are almost always shorthaired and straight- to curve- tailed. Both still whelp in burrows dug into the earth, a feral dog trait.

Temperament
A fiercely independent breed, Kintamanis can be aggressively territorial while at the same time tender and affectionate with their own families. While most dog breeds are disinclined to climbing and heights, Kintamanis will climb across roofs and spend parts of the day happily installed sitting or sleeping atop a garden wall. They are light-footed and move freely, smoothly and lithely, and will bark when confronted with an unfamiliar sound or sight.

Accreditation
The Bangli Regency authority facilitates the Kintamani Dog Exhibition and Contest every year to promote the Kintamani Dog. The authority also guides Kintamani Dog breeders, makes rules about Kintamani Dog purification areas and has made a demonstration pilot project in some villages.

See also
 Dogs portal
 List of dog breeds
 List Of Indonesian Dog Breeds

References

FCI breeds
Dog breeds originating in Indonesia
Bali
Spitz breeds